The Forme of Cury (The Method of Cooking,  from Middle French : 'to cook') is an extensive 14th-century collection of medieval English recipes. Although the original manuscript is lost, the text appears in nine manuscripts, the most famous in the form of a scroll with a headnote citing it as the work of "the chief Master Cooks of King Richard II". The name The Forme of Cury is generally used for the family of recipes rather than any single manuscript text. It is among the oldest extant English cookery books, and the earliest known to mention olive oil, gourds, and spices such as mace and cloves.

Context 

The collection was named The Forme of Cury by Samuel Pegge, who published an edition of one of the manuscripts in 1780 for a trustee of the British Museum, Gustavus Brander. It is one of the best-known medieval guides to cooking. The Forme of Cury may have been written partly to compete with Le Viandier of Taillevent, a French cookery book created at about the same time. This supports the idea that banquets were a symbol of power and prestige for medieval lords and kings.

Approach 

In the preamble, the authors explain that the recipes are meant to teach a cook how to make common dishes and unusual or extravagant banquet dishes. They also note that the recipes were written with the advice of the best experts in medicine and philosophy.

The Forme of Cury is the first known English cookery book to mention some ingredients such as cloves, olive oil, mace and gourds. Many recipes contain what were then rare and valuable spices, such as nutmeg, ginger, pepper, cinnamon, and cardamom. In addition to imparting flavour, many of the spices called for were included specifically to impart rich colouring to the finished dishes for the purpose of, as Pegge says, "gratifying the sight". There is a particular emphasis on yellows, reds, and greens, but gilding and silvering were also used in several of the recipes. Yellow was achieved with saffron or egg yolk, red with "sanders" (sandalwood) or alkanet, and green often with minced parsley. There are recipes for preparing many types of animal meat, including whale, crane, curlew, heron, seal and porpoise. There are about ten vegetable recipes, including one for a vinaigrette salad, which indicates influence from Portugal and Spain, as French cooks rarely used vegetables at that time. There are also several pasta dishes, evidence of Italian influence.

Some recipes in The Forme of Cury appear to have been influenced by the Liber de Coquina, which had contributions from Arabic cuisine. The confectionery-like  confirms the connection with Sicily (which had been Arab, Catalan and Norman), as it uses the Arab technique of cooking in soft ball syrup.

Sample recipe 

The following is a recipe from the modern critical edition:

In modern English:

Modern recreations 

The Café at the Rylands, in Manchester's John Rylands Library where the manuscript is kept, cooked Tart in Ymber Day, Compast, Payn Puff, Frumenty and Gingerbrede, accompanied by Piment (spiced wine), for invited guests in 2009.

See also 

 Apicius – a collection of Roman cookery recipes
 Liber de Coquina – 14th-century cookbook of Italian and French origin
 Utilis Coquinario – another Middle English cookbook
 Le Viandier – 14th-century French cookbook

Notes

References

Bibliography 

  (modern critical edition)

External links
British Library, Add. MS 5016, a 15th-century copy of The Forme of Cury in scroll format.
John Rylands Library, English MS 7; (index to the images)
, an 18th-century edition (page images)
Text, links and modern versions at the Foods of England project
Pygg in sawse sawge (British Library)

Medieval cookbooks
Middle English literature
History of English cuisine